Konstantynów  is a village in Biała Podlaska County, Lublin Voivodeship, in eastern Poland. It is the seat of the gmina (administrative district) called Gmina Konstantynów.

The village has a population of 1,437.

References

Villages in Biała Podlaska County
Podlachian Voivodeship
Siedlce Governorate
Kholm Governorate
Lublin Voivodeship (1919–1939)